Leingarten is a town in the district of Heilbronn, Baden-Württemberg, Germany. It is situated 7 km west of Heilbronn. It was formed 1 January 1970, when the municipalities of Großgartach and Schluchtern merged.

Geography

Location
Leingarten is situated in the west of the district of Heilbronn at the Lein, a feeder of the river Neckar, at the base of the Heuchelberg.

Leingarten consists of the formerly independent municipalities Großgartach und Schluchtern, both have grown seamlessly together since they merged.

Neighbouring cities and municipalities are (clockwise, beginning in the east): Heilbronn, Nordheim (Württemberg) and Schwaigern.

Main sights
Visible from afar is Leingarten's trademark, the Heuchelberger Warte (Heuchelberg Watch), built 1483 by Duke Eberhard I of Württemberg.

In 2011 major renovation work began on Leingarten's city hall which included installing a new facade on the historically important building.

Twin municipalities
Leingarten's is twinned with:
 Lésigny, France, since May 1975
 Asola, Italy, since 30 October  2004

Personalities

Honorary citizen 

 Hermann Eppler (born 1937), longtime mayor of Leingarten (1970-2002), honorary citizen of Leingarten since 2012

Other persons associated with the place 

 Ortwin Czarnowski (born 1940 in Tempelberg), former cyclist and teacher, lives in Leingarten

See also
Dautel

References

External links
 Official website

Heilbronn (district)